Ibrahim Bingöl (born 24 September 1993) is an Austrian footballer of Kurdish descent. He is under contract with Turkish TFF Second League club Vanspor FK, but is not included in their 2022–23 league squad.

References

1993 births
People from Muş
Austrian people of Turkish descent
Living people
Austrian footballers
Association football midfielders
Kapfenberger SV players
SV Austria Salzburg players
Wolfsberger AC players
Ankara Keçiörengücü S.K. footballers
Ankara Demirspor footballers
Ofspor footballers
2. Liga (Austria) players
Austrian Football Bundesliga players
TFF Second League players
TFF Third League players
Austrian Landesliga players